Ketevan is the sixth studio album by Georgian-British singer Katie Melua, released in the United Kingdom on 16 September 2013 (her 29th birthday) through Dramatico. At birth Melua was given the name Ketevan, but later she adopted the name Katie.

Promotion

The lead single promoting the album, "I Will Be There", was released on 12 July 2013, together with an accompanying music video of a concert version of the song.

A music video for "Love Is a Silent Thief" was released onto YouTube on 13 September 2013. A video for "The Love I'm Frightened Of" was released on 7 October.

Track listing

Personnel

Katie Melua – vocals
Tim Harries – bass
Mike Batt – piano, accordion, harmonium, backing vocals
Dan Hawkins – bass
Luke Batt – guitar, piano, drums, percussion
Joe Yoshida – drums
Henry Spinetti – drums, percussion
Chris Spedding – guitar
Freddie Hill – drums
Paul Stevens – clarinet
John Parricelli – ukulele, guitar, banjo
Paul Jones – harmonica
Fabien Taverne – ukulele

Charts

Weekly charts

Year-end charts

References

2013 albums
Katie Melua albums
Albums produced by Mike Batt